Andre Young, better known as Dr. Dre (born 1965), is an American rapper.

Andre Young may also refer to:
Andre Young (American football) (born 1953), former football player
Andre Young (basketball) (born 1990), former American basketball player